Alphonse Liguori Chaupa (27 July 1959 – 21 March 2016) was a Roman Catholic bishop.

Ordained to the priesthood in 1987, Chaupa was named auxiliary bishop of the Roman Catholic Archdiocese of Rabaul, Papua New Guinea. From 2003 until 2008, Chaupa then served as bishop of the Roman Catholic Diocese of Kimbe, Papua New Guinea.

See also

Notes

1959 births
2016 deaths
21st-century Roman Catholic bishops in Papua New Guinea
Roman Catholic bishops of Kimbe
Roman Catholic bishops of Rabaul